Euphaneropidae is an extinct family of prehistoric jawless fishes in the extinct order Euphanerida. These fishes are characterised by a greatly elongated branchial apparatus which covers most of the length of the body. Fossils are known from the Lower Silurian and Middle Devonian of Scotland, and the Upper Devonian of Canada. In particular, Euphanerops is unique in that it has two anal fins.

Taxonomy
Phylogeny is based on Mikko's Phylogeny Archive
 Genus †Ciderius van der Brugghen 2015
 †Ciderius cooperi van der Brugghen 2015
 Genus †Cornovichthys Newman & Trewin, 2001
 †Cornovichthys blaauweni Newman & Trewin, 2001
 Genus †Euphanerops Woodward 1900 [Legendrelepis Arsenault & Janvier 1991]
 †Euphanerops longaevus Woodward 1900 [Legendrelepis parenti Arsenault & Janvier 1991]

References 

 Super-Class Agnatha. T. Jeffery Parker and William A. Haswell, Textbook of Zoology Vertebrates pp 164–202

External links 
 

 

Anaspidomorphi
Prehistoric jawless fish families